The 1946 West Virginia Intercollegiate Athletic Conference football season was the season of college football played by the 13 member schools of the West Virginia Intercollegiate Athletic Conference (WVIAC) as part of the 1946 college football season.

The West Liberty State Hilltoppers won the WVIAC championship with a 7–2 record (4–0 against conference opponents) and outscored all opponents by a total of 183 to 70.

Conference overview

Teams

West Liberty State

The 1946 West Liberty State Hilltoppers football team represented West Liberty State College (later renamed West Liberty University of West Liberty, West Virginia. In their 11th year under head coach Joe Bartell, the Hilltoppers compiled a 7–2 record (4–0 against WVIAC teams), won the WVIAC championship, and outscored opponents by a total of 183 to 70.

Marshall

The 1946 Marshall Thundering Herd football team was an American football team that represented Marshall University of Huntington, West Virginia. In its ninth season under head coach Cam Henderson, the team compiled a 2–7–1 record and was outscored by a total of 190 to 145.

Potomac State

The 1946 Potomac State Catamounts football team was an American football team that represented Potomac State College of Keyser, West Virginia. Led by head coach D.G. Lough, the Catamounts compiled a 7–2 record (7–1 against WVIAC teams), finished in third place in the WVIAC, and outscored opponents by a total of 105 to 49.

West Virginia Tech

The 1946 West Virginia Tech Golden Bears football team was an American football team that represented the West Virginia University Institute of Technology of Beckley, West Virginia. Led by head coach Steve Harrick, the team compiled a 6–2 record (5–1 against WVIAC teams), finished in fourth place in the WVIAC, and outscored opponents by a total of 96 to 66.

Fairmont State

The 1946 Fairmont State Fighting Falcons football team was an American football team that represented Fairmont State University of Fairmont, West Virginia. Led by head coach Squibb Wilson, the Fighting Falcons compiled a 4–3–1 record (3–1–1 against WVIAC teams), finished in fifth place in the WVIAC, and were outscored by a total of 70 to 55.

West Virginia Wesleyan

The 1946 West Virginia Wesleyan Bobcats football team was an American football team that represented West Virginia Wesleyan College of Buckhannon, West Virginia. Led by head coach Cecil B. Ross, the Bobcats compiled a 6–3 record (4–3 against WVIAC teams), finished in sixth place in the WVIAC, and outscored opponents by a total of 134 to 97.

Davis & Elkins

The 1946 Davis & Elkins Senators football team was an American football team that represented Davis & Elkins College of Elkins, West Virginia. Led by head coach Harvey E. Rooker, the Senators compiled a 3–5–2 record (2–3–1 against WVIAC teams), finished in seventh place in the WVIAC, and were outscored by a total of 121 to 59.

Morris Harvey

The 1946 Morris Harvey Golden Eagles football team was an American football team that represented Morris Harvey College (now part of University of Charleston) of Charleston, West Virginia. Alderson Propps began the season as head football coach and athletic director at Morris Harvey, but resigned after the team lost its first two games. He was succeeded by assistant coach C. Eddie King. The Eagles compiled an overall record 2–5 record with  mark of 2–3 in conference play, finishing in eighth place in the WVIAC. They were outscored by a total of 117 to 38.

Concord State

The 1946 Concord State Mountain Lions football team was an American football team that represented Concord State University of Athens, West Virginia. Led by head coach James Callaghan, the team compiled a 1–5–2 record (1–3–2 against WVIAC teams), finished in ninth place in the WVIAC, and were outscored by a total of 126 to 34.

Glenville State

The 1946 Glenville State Pioneers football team was an American football team that represented Glenville State University of Glenville, West Virginia. In their first year under head coach Carlos Ratliff, the team compiled a 1–5–2 record (1–5–2 against WVIAC teams), finished in tenth place in the WVIAC, and were outscored by a total of 63 to 32.

Shepherd State

The 1946 Shepherd State Rams football team was an American football team that represented Shepherd State University of Shepherdstown, West Virginia. Led by head coach C.D. Lowe, the team compiled a 1–5 record (1–5 against WVIAC teams), finished in eleventh place in the WVIAC, and were outscored by a total of 102 to 21.

Bethany

The 1946 Bethany Bison football team was an American football team that represented Bethany College of Bethany, West Virginia. In their first year under head coach Don L. Phillips, the team compiled a 1–7 record (0–2 against WVIAC teams), finished in twelfth place in the WVIAC, and were outscored by a total of 124 to 45.

Salem

The 1946 Salem Tigers football team was an American football team that represented Salem University of Salem, West Virginia. Led by head coach Sam Gwosden, the team compiled a 0–8 record (0–5 against WVIAC teams), finished in 13th place in the WVIAC, and were outscored by a total of 192 to 18.

References